Karl August Möbius (7 February 1825 in Eilenburg – 26 April 1908 in Berlin) was a German zoologist who was a pioneer in the field of ecology and a former director of the Museum für Naturkunde in Berlin.

Early life 

Möbius was born in Eilenburg in Saxony. At the age of four he attended primary school at the Bergschule Eilenburg, and at the age of 12 he was sent by his father to train as a teacher. In 1844 he passed the exams with distinction and began working as teacher in Seesen, on the northwest edge of the Harz mountain range. In 1849, and encouraged by Alexander von Humboldt,  he began studying natural science and philosophy at Natural History Museum of Berlin. After he graduated, he taught from 1853 to 1868 zoology, botany, mineralogy, geography, physics, and chemistry at the Gelehrtenschule des Johanneums in Hamburg.

Oysters and ecology 

In 1863 he opened the first German sea water aquarium, in Hamburg. In 1868, shortly after passing his doctoral examination at the University of Halle, he was appointed Professor of Zoology at the University of Kiel and the director of the Zoological Museum. Marine animals were among his main research interests and his first comprehensive work on the fauna of the Kieler Bucht already emphasized ecological aspects (Die Fauna der Kieler Bucht, co-authored by Heinrich Adolph Meyer, and published in two volumes in 1865 and 1872, respectively). 

Between 1868 and 1870, Möbius was commissioned by the Ministry of Agricultural Affairs in Prussia to conduct research on the Bay of Kiel oyster beds. At the time, the oysters were being gathered from the natural beds and sold at expensive prices to the wealthy elite. Once the railroad was constructed and more opportunities for exportation arose, the demand for the oysters grew exponentially. In turn, the Ministry tasked Möbius with exploring the potential for further exploitation of the beds. Möbius's research resulted in two landmark publications: Über Austern- und Miesmuschelzucht und Hebung derselben an der norddeutschen Küste (1870, in English: On oyster and blue mussel farming in coastal areas of Northern Germany), and Die Auster und die Austernwirtschaft (in English: Oyster and oyster farming), in which he concluded that oyster farming was not a realistic option for Northern Germany. More importantly, he was first to describe in detail the interactions between the different organisms in the ecosystem of the oyster bank, coining the term "biocenose". This remains a key term in synecology (community ecology).

In 1888 Möbius became the director of the Zoological Collections of the Natural History Museum of Berlin, and Professor of Systematic and Geographical Zoology at the Kaiser Wilhelm University, Berlin, where he taught until he retired in 1905, at the age of 80.

Throughout his career, Möbius supported educational institutions such as the Berlin Urania and efforts to spread knowledge about the natural sciences.

Among his students were Friedrich Junge and Friedrich Dahl.

References and external links

 Karl August Möbius (1825–1908)

1825 births
1908 deaths
People from Eilenburg
People from the Province of Saxony
19th-century German zoologists
German ecologists
Scientists active at the Museum für Naturkunde, Berlin
Academic staff of the University of Kiel